The Meherrin Indian Tribe is a state-recognized tribe and nonprofit organization in North Carolina. Its members identify as descendants of the Meherrin people. This group is not federally recognized as a Native American tribe.

The Meherrin Indian Tribe says their autonym is Kauwets'a:ka, which translates to "People of the Water."

Organization 
The Meherrin Indian Tribe was founded in 1976 and incorporated a 501(c)(3) nonprofit organization on February 15, 1977. George E. Pierce of Winton, North Carolina, is the registered agent.

The officers as of 2021 were:
 Acting Chief: Jonathan Caudill
 Secretary: Dorthy McAuly
 Treasurer: Tomika Brown
 Counncilman: Jerome James.

They have more than 900 members.

Identity 
In the 1990s, the member claimed descent from Sallie M. Smith Lewis (ca. 1844–1904), who they described as "the last full-blooded Meherrin Indian." In 2011, they identified as descendants of Meherrin people who they said lived on Potecasi Creek in North Carolina. The historical Meherrin people were last described as living in North Carolina in 1763. The proposed finding by the Bureau of Indian Affairs Office of Acknowledgment found that "evidence does not demonstrate that Sallie M. (Smith) Lewis or the historical landowners allegedly near Potecasi Creek were Indian, Meherrin Indian, or members of a Meherrin Indian or other Indian tribe."

State-recognition 
The State of North Carolina designated the Meherrin Indian Tribe as state-recognized tribe in 1986.

Petition for recognition 
In 1995, the Meherrin Indian Tribe filed a petition with the Bureau of Indian Affairs for federal acknowledgment of existence as an Indian tribe. The proposed finding by the Office of Federal Acknowledgment (OFA) declined their petition and ruled that "The petitioner has not documented, nor has the OFA identified a historical Indian tribe, or tribes that combined, from which its members descend."

Activity 
The Meherrin Indian Tribe hosts an annual powwow held on their dance grounds between Ahoskie and Murfreesboro. They also maintain a garden.

The Z. Smith Reynolds Foundation and Franklin P. and Arthur W. Perdue Foundation have given grants to the Mehrrin Indian Tribe.

Notes

External links
 

Cultural organizations based in North Carolina
Non-profit organizations based in North Carolina
State-recognized tribes in the United States
1976 establishments in North Carolina
1977 establishments in North Carolina